The Sindhi Wikipedia is a free encyclopedia, started February 6, 2006. It is the Sindhi language edition of Wikipedia, a free, open-content encyclopedia. It has  articles. Since 2014, the encyclopedia has experienced an overall increase in content.

History

2006 to 2008 
The Sindhi Wikipedia was started on February 10, 2006, by Professor Ahsan Ahmed Aursani.

2009 to 2011

2012 to 2014

2015 to 2017 
During this time, the Sindhi Wikipedia has expanded and some technical issues have been resolved. Sindhi Wikipedia users have improved content, references, technical issues, categorization, templates, and infoboxes. Recently, Sindhi Wikipedians arranged a Wikipedia awareness workshop in Karachi.

Milestones

Users and editors

See also 

 Urdu Wikipedia
 Saraiki Wikipedia

References

External links

  Sindhi Wikipedia
  Sindhi Wikipedia mobile version (homepage not yet configured)

Wikipedias by language
Internet properties established in 2006
Sindhi-language encyclopedias
Sindhi-language mass media